Kitale is an agricultural town in northern Rift Valley  Kenya situated between Mount Elgon and the Cherangany Hills at an elevation of around . Its population is 106,187 as of 2009. Kitale is the headquarter town of Trans-Nzoia County. Kitale is reachable by air through Kitale Airport. The postal code for Kitale is 30200.

The National Museum of Western Kenya is located at Kitale. It is a natural history museum and was originally created by Lt Col. Hugh Stoneham in 1926. Just next to the museum there is a demonstration farm with agroforestry practices run by a Swedish non-governmental organisation called Vi Agroforestry.

Climate 
Kitale has a temperate oceanic climate (Köppen climate classification Cfb).

References 

Populated places in Trans-Nzoia County
Rift Valley Province
Cities in the Great Rift Valley
County capitals in Kenya